Toyoshima (written: 豊島 or 豊嶋) is a Japanese surname. Notable people with the surname include:

, Japanese biophysicist
, Japanese airman and prisoner of war
, Japanese voice actress
, Japanese shogi player
Shigeki Toyoshima (born 1971), Japanese high jumper
, Japanese rugby sevens player
Tak Toyoshima (born 1971), American comic strip cartoonist
, Japanese politician
, Japanese footballer

Japanese-language surnames